Hayes House is a historic home on Fairview Avenue in Altamont in Albany County, New York.  It was built in 1910 and is a large -story, square frame dwelling on a stone foundation.  The front facade features an enclosed porch on the first floor and balconies on the second and third. Miles Hayes (1856-1925) commissioned plans for this classical revival house in 1912.

The house was built by carpenter Earl W. Teter for a miller named Miles Hayes (1856-1925) and was preceded on the property by a less impressive house. Hayes had the earlier house moved to another location on his property. The new house's side porch faced his grain mill, and allowed him to oversee operations at the mill. From 1970 to 2003 it was owned by the Altamont Fair, to be maintained as a museum. It is again privately owned.
It was listed on the National Register of Historic Places in 1973.

References

Houses on the National Register of Historic Places in New York (state)
Houses completed in 1910
Houses in Albany County, New York
National Register of Historic Places in Albany County, New York
Altamont, New York